PW-Sat is a series of satellites that includes the first Polish artificial satellite which was launched 13 February 2012 from ELA-1 at Guiana Space Centre aboard Italian-built Vega launch vehicle during its maiden voyage. PW-Sat1's mission was to test experimental elastic solar cells, as well as an orbital decay technology consisting of a "tail" designed to speed re-entry. It was expected to last for 1 year.

PW-Sat1 was a type of CubeSat satellite constructed by the Faculty of Power and Aeronautical Engineering of Warsaw University of Technology in cooperation with the Space Research Centre of the Polish Academy of Sciences.

History
The PW-Sat project was created in 2004 when group of students from Warsaw University of Technology decided to build satellite compatible with CubeSat 1U standard. Initially planned for a 2007 launch, delays in the development of the Vega caused the mission to be postponed until 2012. The cost of the project was estimated to be 200,000 Polish zloty (63,205 USD), with funding coming from the university's budget, as well as from an agreement between Poland and the European Space Agency.

Hardware
PW-Sat1 was a 10x10x10 cm cube with a mass of 1 kg. It is equipped with the following hardware:
EPS: power module
ANTS: antenna management system
COM: communication compartment
PLD: elastic solar cells management sub-system
OBC: main computer
Access port
Elastic solar cells (part of primary mission)
Atmospheric drag device (part of primary mission)
AX.25 transceiver
CW beacon transmitting on 145.901 MHz for tracking by radio amateurs

PW-Sat1

Mission
PW-Sat1 was launched on 13 February 2012, 10:00 UTC from ELA-1 at Guiana Space Centre (Kourou, French Guiana) aboard the maiden flight of the Vega rocket, together with LARES and ALMASat-1 satellites and 6 other CubeSats built by various European universities. It was deployed 1 hour 10 minutes into the flight from the P-POD-2 container, along with the ROBUSTA and MaSat-1 CubeSats.

First signals from satellite were received around 12:10 UTC by radio amateurs. The first Polish reception of PW-Sat1's signals came at 12:15 UTC by CAMK in Warsaw.

PW-Sat1 was planned stay in orbit until 2013, when it was planned to perform a destructive atmospheric reentry. The satellite used a large amount of the batteries' stored energy while performing tasks early in the mission. This battery depletion, combined with orbital maneuvers designed so the satellite would fly over Poland, delayed deployment of the tail. Commands of tail deployment were sent from Earth on April and May 2012, but PW-Sat did not respond to the commands. Due to a hardware issue with the communication module (that was discovered on a few other CubeSats using the same model) communication with the satellite was problematic and the tail couldn't be extended.

PW-Sat1 reentered the atmosphere on 28 October 2014.

Development of a successor, PW-Sat2, begun in September 2013 with launch planned for 2017.

PW-Sat2

Mission

See also

BRITE
Lem (BRITE-PL)
Heweliusz (BRITE-PL)

References

CubeSats
First artificial satellites of a country
Student satellites
Spacecraft launched in 2012
Satellites of Poland
Polish inventions
Spacecraft launched by Vega rockets
2012 in Poland